This is a list of animated television series first aired in 2013.

See also
 List of animated feature films of 2013
 List of Japanese animation television series of 2013

Notes

References

Television series
Animated series
2013
2013
2013-related lists